National Democratic Alliance (NDA) is an Indian political party coalition lead by Bharatiya Janata Party (BJP). Following is the Lok Sabha constituencies-wise list of the National Democratic Alliance candidates for the 2004 Indian general election.

BJP is one of the two major political parties in India; the other being the Indian National Congress. BJP has formed pre-poll alliance with various parties and independent candidates to constitute the National Democratic Alliance. Of the 29 states and 7 union territories, BJP will be having alliance in  states (Assam, Bihar, Jharkhand, Karnataka, Kerala, Maharashtra Nagaland, Punjab, Rajasthan, Tamil Nadu and Uttar Pradesh) and  union territory (Puducherry) with regional political parties.

Together, NDA will be contesting for all 543 constituency seats that will form the 14th Lok Sabha. BJP will form the highest share of NDA by contesting in  constituencies; followed by other large parties like,JDU (33), AIADMK (33), TDP (33), AITC (31) and Shiv Sena (22)

Lok Sabha 2004 general election

Andhra Pradesh

Arunachal Pradesh

Assam

Bihar

Chhattisgarh

Goa

Gujarat

Haryana

Himachal Pradesh

Jammu and Kashmir

Jharkhand

Karnataka

Kerala

Madhya Pradesh

Maharashtra

Manipur

Meghalaya

Mizoram

Nagaland

Orissa

Punjab

Rajasthan

Sikkim

Tamil Nadu

Tripura

Uttar Pradesh

Uttaranchal

West Bengal

Constituencies by Union territory

Andaman and Nicobar Islands

Chandigarh

Dadra and Nagar Haveli

Daman and Diu

Lakshadweep

NCT of Delhi

Pondicherry

References 

2004 Indian general election
Lists of Indian political candidates
National Democratic Alliance